Anchiale stolli is a medium-sized stick insect found in the Solomon Islands.

Description
Anchiale stolli are geenish-brown in color. Both sexes have fully developed wings but only males are capable of flying.

References

External links
Phasmatodea.com: Anchiale buruense "Buru"

Phasmatidae
Insects described in 1898